A precipitationshed is the upwind ocean and land surface that contributes evaporation to a given, downwind location's precipitation. The concept has been described as an "atmospheric watershed". The concept itself rests on a broad foundation of scholarly work examining the evaporative sources of rainfall. Since its formal definition, the precipitationshed has become an element in water security studies, examinations of sustainability, and mentioned as a potentially useful tool for examining vulnerability of rainfall dependent ecosystems.

Concept 
In an effort to conceptualize the recycling of evaporation from a specific location to the spatially explicit region that receives this moisture, the precipitationshed concept was expanded to the evaporationshed. This expanded concept has been highlighted as particularly useful for providing a spatially explicit region for examining the impacts of significant land-use change, such as deforestation, irrigation, or agricultural intensification.

See also
 Water cycle
 Moisture recycling
 Line Gordon

References

External links 
 Stockholm Resilience Centre Whiteboard talk series
 CABI: Precipitationsheds - a new concept for water science
 Water Resilience for Human Prosperity

 
Hydrology
Water and the environment
Precipitation
Water streams